Jungle Boy may refer to:

People 
 Jungle Boy (wrestler), ring name of professional wrestler Jack Perry
 Zach Walters, light heavyweight professional boxer

Music 
 "Jungle Boy", a song by John Eddie from John Eddie
 "Jungle Boy", a song by the Michael Hutchence side project, Flame Fortune
 "Jungle Boy", a song by Bow Wow Wow from their second studio album See Jungle! See Jungle! Go Join Your Gang, Yeah. City All Over! Go Ape Crazy.

Film and television 
 Jungle Boy (1987 film), a 1987 Malayalam film directed by P. Chandrakumar
 Jungle Boy (1996 film), a 1996 direct-to-video animated film produced by Blye Migicovsky Productions and Phoenix Animation Studios
 Jungle Boy (1998 film), a 1998 direct-to-video live action film
 Jungle Boy, a cartoon short aired serially during the first season of Johnny Bravo

Other uses 
 Jungle Boy, the prototype of Taito's Jungle Hunt arcade game 
 Bomba, the Jungle Boy, a series of adventure books for boys